Albany Hancock  (24 December 1806 – 1873), English naturalist, biologist and supporter of Charles Darwin, was born on Christmas Eve in Newcastle upon Tyne. He is best known for his works on marine animals and coal-measure fossils.
Albany Hancock was brother of the naturalist John Hancock. The brothers lived with their sister, Mary Jane, at 4 St. Mary's Terrace, Newcastle, now part of a listed terrace at 14-20 Great North Road.

Early life and education
Hancock was educated at The Royal Grammar School, before becoming a trainee for a local solicitor. He completed the expected period in articles and passed all the required examinations to become a solicitor himself, even going so far as to acquire an office in Newcastle with a view to establishing his own practice.

Career
Hancock's true interests lay elsewhere, and after a brief period of employment with a manufacturing firm, dedicated the rest of his life to his true calling, natural history.

Publications
Although Hancock was an enthusiastic amateur naturalist from childhood, his first serious publications did not appear until 1836, when he was 30. These were Note on the Occurrence of Ranicefis trifurcatus on the Northumberland Coast and  Note on Falco ruazlies, Regulus ignicafiillus and Larus in Jardine's Magazine of Zoology and Botany.

From this slow start, Hancock went on to become one of the foremost naturalists of his day, producing some seventy notable publications many in the Annals and Magazine of Natural History.

Hancock was a founder member of the Natural History Society of Northumberland, Durham, and Newcastle upon Tyne, and of the Tyneside Naturalists' Field Club. He was a member of the provisional board that established the College of Physical Science in Newcastle, a Fellow of the Linnean Society, a corresponding-member of the Zoological Society of London and an honorary member of the Imperial Botanico-Zoological Society of Vienna. He was awarded the Royal Medal of the Royal Society in 1858.

Hancock Museum
The Hancock Museum in Newcastle upon Tyne is named after the Hancock brothers, both of whom took an instrumental part in getting the museum built. The museum contains many specimens from their collections.

Bibliography 

 Alder J. & Hancock A. (1845-1855). A monograph of the British nudibranchiate Mollusca: with figures of all the species. The Ray Society, London. Published in 8 parts:
 Alder J. & Hancock A. (1845) part 1.
 Alder J. & Hancock A. (1846) part 2.
 Alder J. & Hancock A. (1847) part 3.
 Alder J. & Hancock A. (1848) part 4.
 Alder J. & Hancock A. (1851) part 5.
 Alder J. & Hancock A. (1854) part 6.
 Alder J. & Hancock A. (1855) part 7.
 Eliot E. (1910) part 8 (suppl.)

References 

 Obituary: Nature, 20 November, 1873, pp. 43-44 at University of Wisconsin Digital Collection

External links 

 
 
 Albany Hancock at the Natural History Society of Northumbria
  Joshua Alder (1792-1867) & Albany Hancock (1806-1873)
AnimalBase  digitized literature includes A monograph of the British nudibranchiate mollusca)

1806 births
1873 deaths
19th-century British geologists
19th-century British zoologists
British evolutionary biologists
Scientists from Newcastle upon Tyne
People educated at the Royal Grammar School, Newcastle upon Tyne
Royal Medal winners